Heinz Ludwig Fraenkel-Conrat (July 29, 1910 – April 10, 1999) was a biochemist, famous for his research on viruses.

Early life
Fraenkel-Conrat was born in Breslau/Germany.

He was the son of Lili Conrat and Professor Ludwig Fraenkel, director of the Women's Clinic of the University of Breslau, Germany. His father, Ludwig Fraenkel, was a prominent gynecologist and medical researcher who published regarding endocrine function, social gynecology, and sexology during the first decades of the 20th century, and was one of the legion of scientists summarily dismissed from their positions by the Nazis.

Academic career
He received an MD from the University of Breslau in 1933. Due to the rise of Nazism in Germany he left for Scotland in 1933 and finished his PhD at the University of Edinburgh (1936). After completing his doctorate, he emigrated to the United States, becoming a naturalized citizen in 1941. In the 1940s Fraenkel-Conrat visited his sister and brother-in-law, biochemist Karl Slotta, a pioneer in the study of progesterone, estriol, and medical use of venom, who was then director of the Chemical Institute of the Instituto Butantan in São Paulo, Brazil, from 1935 to 1948.  Frankel-Conrat remained for one year of biochemical research at the Instituto Butantan.  He worked at a number of institutes before joining the faculty at the University of California, Berkeley in 1952 where he remained until his death.

His most noted research was on the tobacco mosaic virus (TMV) and the holmes ribgrass virus (HRV). He discovered that the genetic control of viral reproduction was RNA and that it is carried in the nucleic core of each virus. In 1955 he and biophysicist Robley Williams showed that a functional virus could be created out of purified RNA and a protein coat. In 1960 he announced the complete sequencing of the 158 amino acids in the virus.

Death
He died of lung failure on April 10, 1999 at the Kaiser Hospital in Oakland, at the age of eighty-eight.

References

Further reading
 
 

American virologists
1910 births
1999 deaths
American biochemists
German emigrants to the United States
Recipients of the Albert Lasker Award for Basic Medical Research
Alumni of the University of Edinburgh
Members of the United States National Academy of Sciences